Shareese Woods (born February 20, 1985) is an American track and field athlete. She has competed internationally in sprint and has been on United States teams at the 2006 NACAC Under-23 Championships in Athletics, 2007 NACAC Championships, 2007 Pan American Games and 2008 IAAF World Indoor Championships, medaling at all of those competitions.

Biography
An Army brat born in Fort Bragg, North Carolina, she attended both Lee County Senior High School in Sanford, North Carolina and Prince George County High School, in Prince George, Virginia. During that time, she was a three-time regional champion, and two-time state champion in the 400m Dash in a time of 55.00 seconds.

She went on to attend UNC Charlotte; receiving a B.A. in Mass Media Communications, and becoming the most decorated athlete in school history, owning four indoor records, five outdoor records, three indoor conference records, four outdoor conference records, and four all-American awards, with the highest NCAA ranking in UNC Charlotte history. Notably, she also was recognized in Sports Illustrated "Faces in the Crowd".

Post-collegiately, Woods went on to run professionally, sponsored by Adidas. Her most notable accomplishments are 2008 USA Indoor 400m Champion, and two-time World Indoor 400m Bronze Medalist with a time of 51.41.

Personal records

References
http://www.iaaf.org/athletes/biographies/letter=w/country=usa/athcode=206791/index.html
https://web.archive.org/web/20110716085943/http://www.charlotte49ers.com/fls/23200//10%20Track%20Stats/Top%20Ten%20Lists.pdf

https://web.archive.org/web/20110213003853/http://www.atlantic10.com/auto_pdf/p_hotos/s_chools/atl10/sports/c-otrack/auto_pdf/WOT2010
http://sportsillustrated.cnn.com/scorecard/faces/2007/02/05/

1985 births
American female sprinters
Living people
Sportspeople from North Carolina
Pan American Games track and field athletes for the United States
Athletes (track and field) at the 2007 Pan American Games
Pan American Games medalists in athletics (track and field)
Pan American Games silver medalists for the United States
People from Fort Bragg, North Carolina
World Athletics Indoor Championships medalists
Medalists at the 2007 Pan American Games
21st-century American women